Hafslund Nycomed is a defunct company that existed between 1986 and 1996 after the power and industry company Hafslund had bought the pharmaceutical company Nycomed. The company was listed on the Oslo Stock Exchange. In 1996 it was demerged and Nycomed merged with the British pharmaceutical company Amersham, while Hafslund took the power division.

References 

Pharmaceutical companies of Norway
Defunct electric power companies of Norway
Pharmaceutical companies established in 1986
1986 establishments in Norway
Companies formerly listed on the Oslo Stock Exchange
Pharmaceutical companies disestablished in 1996
Hafslund (company)